Horton Glacier is a glacier at the east side of Mount Barre and Mount Gaudry, flowing southeast from Adelaide Island into Ryder Bay, Antarctica. It was named by the UK Antarctic Place-Names Committee in 1977 for Colin P. Horton, a British Antarctic Survey builder at the nearby Rothera Station, 1976–77.

See also
 List of glaciers in the Antarctic
 Glaciology

References

 

Glaciers of Adelaide Island